Anastrophyllum is a genus of liverworts belonging to the family Anastrophyllaceae.

The genus has cosmopolitan distribution.

Species:
 Anastrophyllum adulterinum (Gottsche) Stephani
 Anastrophyllum alpinum Steph.
 Anastrophyllum hellerianum (Nees ex Lindenb.) R.M. Schust.

References

Jungermanniales
Jungermanniales genera